Ubang is a Bendi language of Nigeria. It is notable for having male and female word forms. In the Ubang language, there are masculine and feminine forms of communication. Men are designated to speak the masculine form of the language and women, likewise, speak the feminine form of the language. This form of communication is understandable by both men and women. However, children speak the female language until approximately ten years of age.

Anthropologist Chi Chi Undie commented: "It's almost like two different lexicons... There are a lot of words that men and women share in common, then there are others which are totally different depending on your sex. They don't sound alike, they don't have the same letters, they are completely different words."

Examples of words in male and female Ubang

References

Bendi languages
Languages of Nigeria